Fango may refer to:

 Fango (river), small coastal river in Haute-Corse, France
 Fango (song), song written by Jovanotti, Riccardo Onori and Michael Franti, released in December 2007
 Del Fango Redoubt, fort in Marsaxlokk, Malta
 Flor de Fango, 1908 outdoor sculpture by Enrique Guerra
 Gaius Fuficius Fango (died 40 BCE), Ancient Roman military leader and politician